Panta Rei is the debut album of Serbian singer Jelena Tomašević. The album features two songs that she entered to represent Serbia (and Montenegro) in the Eurovision Song Contest: Jutro (2005) and Oro (2008).

This album was released in October 2008.

Track listing

Songs in italics are bonus tracks.

References
ESCToday: Article on the release of Jelena Tomašević's debut album

2008 albums
Jelena Tomašević albums